Dendrobium amabile is a species of orchid endemic to Vietnam.

References

External links

IOSPE orchid photos, Dendrobium amabile Photo by © Lourens Grobler 
The Beauty of Orchids and Flowers, Dendrobium amabile
Hoa Lan Viet Nam, Orange County Vietnamese Orchid Society, Lan Việt: Dendrobium amabile Thủy tiên tím (Lour.) O'Brien in Vietnamese with link to English translation
Crazyforflowers Dendrobium amabile video

amabile
Endemic orchids of Vietnam
Plants described in 1790